The common name smooth shore crab may apply to more than one species:
Cyclograpsus lavauxi, from New Zealand
Cyclograpsus granulosus, from Australia

Animal common name disambiguation pages